Gary Lee Barnett (born May 23, 1946) is a former American football player and coach. He served as the head coach at Fort Lewis College (1982–1983), Northwestern University (1992–1998), and the University of Colorado at Boulder (1999–2005), compiling a career college football record of 92–94–2.  His 1995 Northwestern team won the Big Ten Conference title, the first for the program since 1936, and played in the school's first Rose Bowl since 1949.  At Colorado, Barnett was suspended briefly in the 2004 offseason due to events stemming from allegations of sexual misconduct by several members of the football team.

Early life and playing career
Barnett attended Parkway Central High School in Chesterfield, Missouri, and graduated from the University of Missouri in 1969 with a bachelor's degree in social studies. He continued on to get his master's degree in 1971 in education. Barnett played wide receiver for Missouri from 1966 to 1969. He lettered his senior year under coach Dan Devine.

Coaching career

Early coaching career
Barnett started his coaching career at the University of Missouri as a graduate assistant from 1969 to 1971 under coach Al Onofrio. After he graduated, he was a successful high school coach at Air Academy High School in Colorado Springs, Colorado for 11 years, nine as head coach. His teams won six conference titles and reached the state semi-finals twice, in 1980 and 1981. Barnett first became a head coach at Fort Lewis College in Durango, Colorado. After two seasons, he left on February 20, 1984 to become an assistant coach at Colorado under Bill McCartney. Barnett was the running backs coach for his first season, and he switched to quarterbacks and fullbacks  for the next seven seasons. On December 3, 1990, he was promoted to offensive coordinator.  His first game as coordinator was against Notre Dame in the 1991 Orange Bowl, which Colorado won to earn their first, and only, national championship.

Northwestern
Later in 1991, he left Colorado to become the head coach at Northwestern, then a perennial doormat team. When he was introduced to the student body he told them that he was going to "take the purple to Pasadena."  He made good on that boast in 1995, when he led Northwestern to one of the best seasons in school history.  The Wildcats won their first Big Ten Conference title since 1936 and played in the 1996 Rose Bowl, their first major-bowl appearance since 1949.  The Wildcats lost 41–32 to USC. The following year, the Wildcats won a share of the Big Ten title and reached the Florida Citrus Bowl, losing 48–28 to Tennessee. Barnett turned a program holding the record for the longest losing streak in Division I-A into a championship caliber organization. Northwestern, however, won only three Big Ten games in his final two seasons as head coach of the Wildcats, including a winless mark in his final year. In 2015, Barnett was selected for membership of the Northwestern University Athletic Hall of Fame. On September 26, 2015, Barnett was recognized with other recent Hall of Fame inductees during the half-time program at the Northwestern football team's home game against Ball State University.

After the success of Northwestern's football teams, Barnett became a sought-after commodity.  In a 2017 article by the Chicago Tribune, it was noted that Barnett turned down head coaching jobs with Georgia and UCLA following the 1995 season.  He also interviewed for the Notre Dame head coaching job following the retirement of Lou Holtz in 1996, however Barnett himself withdrew from consideration.  In 1997, Barnett and Northwestern agreed to a 12-year contract worth $500,000 per year.  Barnett also received consideration for the Texas head coaching job following the 1997 season.

Colorado
In 1999, Barnett left Northwestern after eight seasons and returned to Colorado as the school's 22nd head coach. His on-field career at Colorado was mostly successful.  The Buffaloes won the 2001 conference title, and also won four Big 12 North titles during Barnett's seven-year tenure.  Colorado was also ranked #2 in the nation and part of a controversy with the BCS Poll in the 2001 season when the Nebraska Cornhuskers were selected ahead of Oregon and Colorado for the National Championship game, even though Colorado had just beaten Nebraska 62–36 in the regular season finale (CU went on to defeat Texas in the Big 12 Championship game prior to the selection).

However, his reputation was tarnished by a recruiting scandal, insensitive off-field remarks and failure to maintain the on-field success of his predecessors.  Barnett was alleged to have enticed recruits to come to Colorado with sex and alcohol during recruiting visits, causing the school to self-impose stricter recruiting rules than any other Division I-A school. That scandal, coupled with Barnett's dismissive comments about former placekicker Katie Hnida, who alleged that she had been raped by a teammate, led to Barnett's temporary suspension in 2004 during the off-season. Barnett was reinstated before the start of the 2004 season, and went on to coach the team to an 8–5 record, earning Big 12 Coach of the Year honors along the way.

Barnett continued as coach in 2005, leading the Buffaloes to a 7–2 start. However, the Buffs lost to Iowa State, then suffered a 30–3 thrashing at the hands of Nebraska and a 70–3 blowout by the eventual national champion Texas Longhorns in the Big 12 championship game. Additionally, an anonymous tipster wrote a letter to CU system president Hank Brown accusing Barnett of numerous improprieties, including tampering with sworn testimony.

On December 9, 2005, Barnett was forced to resign and accepted a $3 million buyout. Colorado then went on to play in the Champs Sports Bowl, losing to Clemson. The loss is officially credited to Barnett, even though assistant Mike Hankwitz served as interim head coach for the game.

In June 2007, the Buffaloes were placed under probation for two years and fined US$100,000 for undercharging 133 student-athletes for meals over a six-year span (2000–01 to 2005–06 encompassing Barnett's tenure at Colorado) resulting in the major infraction. The football program, with 86 of the 133 student-athletes involved, also lost one scholarship for the next three seasons.

After coaching
Barnett operates the Gary Barnett Foundation, which was formed in February 2005. The foundation is a tax-exempt, non-profit organization that claims to be dedicated to the support of educational programs for economically disadvantaged and at-risk youth. Financials for the foundation show little activity, and even less benefit (expenses were about 115% revenue in 2007, for example, per the previous link). There were rumors that Missouri was considering hiring Barnett during the 2005 season.  Barnett began working as a TV commentator for the BCS show on Fox Sports Net in 2006. Barnett also is a commentator for Sports USA.

Head coaching record

Notes

References

External links
 Gary Barnett Foundation
 Colorado profile

1946 births
Living people
American football wide receivers
College football announcers
Colorado Buffaloes football coaches
Fort Lewis Skyhawks football coaches
Missouri Tigers football coaches
Missouri Tigers football players
Northwestern Wildcats football coaches
Parkway Central High School alumni
High school football coaches in Colorado
People from Chesterfield, Missouri
Sportspeople from Lakeland, Florida
Sportspeople from St. Louis County, Missouri
Coaches of American football from Missouri
Players of American football from Missouri